Aegeridae is a family of fossil prawns. It contains the genera Aeger, Acanthochirana, Anisaeger and Distaeger.

References

Dendrobranchiata
Prehistoric crustacean families
Middle Triassic first appearances
Late Cretaceous extinctions